Howard Reynold Penn OBE (1903–1994), more commonly known simply as H.R. Penn, was a politician who served during the years immediately after the reintroduction of democracy in the British Virgin Islands in 1950.  He was elected as a member of First Legislative Council and continued to serve until his defeat in the 1963 general election.

Prior to the introduction of Ministerial government in 1967, various executive type posts were delegated to members of the Legislative Council in a ministerial-like fashion.  From 1957 to 1960 H.R. Penn was appointed Member for Trade and Production, and he was reappointed to that post from 1960 to 1963.

H.R. Penn later served as the Speaker of the House from 1971 to 1975 under Willard Wheatley's administration.

Record keeping during the early years of politics in the British Virgin Islands was poor; electoral records are incomplete, and there were no newspapers published in the Territory at the time (the first newspaper in the British Virgin Islands, The Island Sun, was first published in 1962).  Much of the information on politics from the early days come from H.R. Penn's memoirs.

Electoral history

Footnotes

1903 births
British Virgin Islands politicians
Officers of the Order of the British Empire
Place of death missing
1994 deaths